Aminpur Bangla or simply Aminpur is a town of Faisalabad district situated at its boundary and touches the boundary of Chiniot district of Punjab province in Pakistan.

It is the part of the NA-106 and PP-109 of Faisalabad constituency of the National Assembly of Pakistan and Provincial Assembly of Punjab.

References

Cities and towns in Faisalabad District